Hiram Pease Graham (March 29, 1820 – January 24, 1902) was an American lumberman and politician.

Born in Windham, Greene County, New York, Graham worked as a millwright and in the lumber business in Allegany County, New York. In 1856, Graham moved to Eau Claire, Wisconsin and was involved in the lumber and manufacturing business. In 1866, Graham served as sheriff of Eau Claire County, Wisconsin and was a Democrat. He served on the Eau Claire Town Board and later on the Eau Claire Common Council. After Eau Claire was incorporated a city, Graham served as the first mayor of Eau Claire. In 1875 and 1876, Graham served in the Wisconsin State Senate. In 1888, President Grover Cleveland appointed postmaster for Eau Claire. Graham died at his home in Eau Claire, Wisconsin after suffering a stroke.

Notes

1820 births
1902 deaths
Mayors of Eau Claire, Wisconsin
People from Greene County, New York
Businesspeople from New York (state)
Businesspeople from Wisconsin
Wisconsin sheriffs
Wisconsin city council members
Democratic Party Wisconsin state senators
Wisconsin postmasters
19th-century American politicians
19th-century American businesspeople